Institutionalist political economy, also known as institutional political economy or IPE, refers to a body of political economy, thought to stem from the works of institutionalists such as Thorstein Veblen, John Commons, Wesley Mitchell and John Dewey. It emphasizes the impact of historical and socio-political factors on the evolution of economic practices, often opposing more rational approaches. In the political sense, this implies the influences actors like the state have on socio-economic practices and the shaping of institutions via political decision-making.

Relevant variables for the study of political institutions include the structures that indicate voting rules, the political system, preferences and ideological leanings of leaders.

Overview
The institutionalist political economics perspective builds upon core theories from institutional economics and further apply them to the field of contemporary political economy. Wesley Mitchell originally differentiated the  institutionalist approach to economics from previous schools of economic thought by emphasizing its focus on the cumulative process of evolutionary change in economics. Contemporary theorists further expand this definition by emphasizing the effects of the historical shift from the classical system of laissez-faire capitalism to contemporary or neoliberal capitalism in the current international economic society, in which various institutions are major actors.

The institutional basis of the rights-obligations structure classically assumed of the market is also examined. This includes processes deciding how legitimate actors and legitimate objects of exchange are determined. At their core, proponents of this school of thought maintain that economics cannot be divorced from the social and political context since the market itself is an institution, which is to say is politically constructed. In this sense institutionalist political economists place themselves in opposition to  neoclassical economists who assert that the market is an autonomous, apolitical domain. They also differ from proponents of the new institutional economics perspective in that institutions are viewed as being able to fundamentally shape the individual rather than as merely placing constraints on the theoretically pre-defined and unchanging individual.

Actors 
J. R. Commons had discussed how institutions were the result of past choices made on the individual level. These choices then decide the structure in which the institutions operate, and how they enable and constrain market actors. The element of evolution returns by institutions changing in terms of workability, marking his pragmatist influence on the subject. Commons therefore separates himself from other institutionalists by implementing this notion of workability, absent in Veblen. The political implications here mainly effect the way in which political parties interact with private collectives in which parties maximize power and collectives maximize their own organisational efficiencies. Here reasonability is decisive for outcome according to Commons. The political dimension of these institutions lies in the way they exercise control over individual action, along with formal and informal rules and customs.

An important aspect of actors within institutional approaches is their potential for morally grounded decision making, which marks a difference from rational approaches. Institutionalist approaches often consider situations in which actors act against their predicted most profitable way of action. This is where institutionalists argue that concepts like habit evolution via institutions come in. Institutionalist accounts have been used to criticize neo-liberal accounts, as it is the institutions that influence how certain actions are understood. The assumption that maximizing profits is the main goal behind incentive-making is widely held in many paradigms, including regulation theory and comparative political economy. This distinction between actors is therefore important for identifying institutional approaches.

Institutionalist economics in political case studies 
 Studies of developmental states, countries with recent, fast economic development, have identified common traits that can be classified as institutional. Some of these institutionalist characteristics include elite- and bureaucracy-led intervention and weak civil society, all with the intent of creating institutions that are designed to further bolster economic and human developmental performance. The way states actively participate in the creation of institutions is therefore object of study, and how they might accomplish the structural changes within the institutions that are necessary to bring about economic development, downplaying the role of the free market.

Case studies of states have identified traits belonging to institutionalist theory, such as historical influences on present situations and socio-political contestation over policies. In a study of Latin American countries economic underperformance has been linked to institutional durability, due to established elites clinging onto arrangements detrimental to national resources. In addition, dominance of these elites has been linked to their relative organizational strength, compared to the weak national elites of various Latin American countries.

See also
 Constitutional economics
 Institutional economics

References

External links
Breaking the Mould: An Institutionalist Political Economy Alternative to the Neoliberal Theory of the Market and the State
Taking capitalism seriously: towards an institutionalist approach to contemporary political economy
Institutionalism as an Approach to Political Economy
American Institutional School
Thorstein Veblen, Articles by Veblen
T. Veblen: Leisure Class
T. Veblen: Why is Economics Not an Evolutionary Science?
T. Veblen: The Beginning of Ownership
T. Veblen: Theory of Business Enterprise

Political economy

économie institutionaliste
sv:Institutionalism